Spoorijzer N.V., or shortened SIJ for NV Spoorwegmaterieel en IJzerconstructie, was a narrow gauge railway manufacturer in Delft, Netherlands.

History  

The company was set up on 4 November 1912 as J.C. Goudriaan's Industrie- en Exportmaatschappij.

The company built in the 1950s approximately 100 "Rail Tractors" which were commonly used in brick factories to replace horses. In total about 160 narrow rail locomotives were built. The last remaining SIJ buildings were closed after several re-organisations in 1977.

The company also imported locomotives from Ruston & Hornsby, for use within the Netherlands and its colonies.

Remaining locomotives 

 Spoorijzer RT 8, power: 8hp, gauge: , formerly Hollandsch-Duitsche Steenfabriek, now: Nationaal Smalspoormuseum, Valkenburg
 Spoorijzer RT 8, Serial No 221, 1962, power: 8hp, gauge: , formerly Betonfabriek De Ringvaart, now: Nationaal Smalspoormuseum, Valkenburg
 Spoorijzer RT 8, Serial No 106, 1952, power: 8hp, gauge: , formerly  Oving Spoor, now: Nationaal Smalspoormuseum, Valkenburg
 Spoorijzer RT 11, Serial No 248, 1963, power: 11hp, gauge: , formerly Betonfabriek De Ringvaart, now: Nationaal Smalspoormuseum, Valkenburg
 Spoorijzer RT 8, Serial No 107, 1952, power: 8hp, gauge: , formerly Oving Spoor, now: Nationaal Smalspoormuseum, Valkenburg
 Spoorijzer RT 11, Serial No 001, 1966, gauge: , formerly NBM Funderingstechniek Gorinchem, now: Nationaal Smalspoormuseum, Valkenburg
 Spoorijzer locomotive of 1956, Serial No 1252, now: Gendt, Lingewaard, Waaldijk

References 

Narrow gauge railways in the Netherlands
Locomotive manufacturers of the Netherlands